The 1951 Navy Midshipmen football team represented the United States Naval Academy (USNA)  as an independent during the 1951 college football season. The team was led by second-year head coach Eddie Erdelatz.

Schedule

References

Navy
Navy Midshipmen football seasons
Navy Midshipmen football